This is a list of bands that play electronicore, a music genre that blends metalcore with styles of electronic music.

List of bands 

 Abandon All Ships
 Arsonists Get All the Girls
 Asking Alexandria
 Attack Attack!
 Bring Me the Horizon
 The Browning
 Crossfaith
 Electric Callboy
 Enter Shikari
 Escape the Day
 Esprit D'Air
 Fail Emotions
 Fear, and Loathing in Las Vegas
 His Statue Falls
 I See Stars
 Jamie's Elsewhere
 Palisades
 Passcode
 We Butter the Bread with Butter

See also 

 List of Nintendocore bands
 List of electronic rock artists

References 

 
Lists of metalcore bands